Pierre Frank Watkin (December 29, 1887 – February 3, 1960) was an American character actor best known for playing distinguished authority figures throughout the Golden Age of Hollywood. He is best remembered for his roles of Mr. Skinner the bank president in The Bank Dick (1940); Lou Gehrig's father-in-law Mr. Twitchell in Pride of the Yankees (1942); and the first actor to portray Perry White in the Superman serials Superman (1948) and Atom Man vs. Superman (1950).

Early life 
Watkin was born on December 29, 1887, in Afton Township, Iowa, the third of four sons born to Charles Henry Watkin and Elizabeth Jeannette (née Scoles) Watkin.

When Watkin was a young child, his family moved to Sioux City, Iowa, where his parents ran a boarding house for actors. This environment influenced Watkin to go into acting. When he was a teenager, the family moved to Kansas City, Missouri, where he began acting in theater.

Career 
Watkin began his career touring the Midwest with various theatrical troupes, including with the company of Morgan Wallace. In 1918, he formed his own theatrical troupe, the Pierre Watkin Players, which was first headquartered in Sioux City, before moving to Lincoln, Nebraska, in 1927. Among those in his troupe included Lyle Talbot (under his birth name "Lysle Talbot"); Georgia Neese Clark and her first husband George Clark; and Roy Hillard, the father of Harriet Nelson. However, the troupe disassembled when Watkin went East to pursue a Broadway career. The next year, Watkin made his made his Broadway debut in the 1928 play Possession.

Following a string of unsuccessful plays on Broadway, and with many actors moving out West, Watkin moved to California in 1935 to pursue a film career. Shortly after arriving, he made his film debut in the Bette Davis film Dangerous, having been offered a role by the film's director Alfred E. Green, an acquaintance of his from Broadway. Over his 25 year career, Watkin became well-known as a freelance actor, often appearing in bit roles — many uncredited — as wealthy distinguished authority figures such as bankers and judges. Watkin was a favorite of Davis and director Frank Capra, who dubbed Watkin his "one-man stock company". Although known as a character actor, he did obtain some major roles, such as bank president Mr. Skinner in The Bank Dick with W.C. Fields, and opposite Gary Cooper and Teresa Wright as Mr. Twitchell in the Lou Gehrig biographical drama film The Pride of the Yankees.

In 1940, Watkin made his first serial, portraying the main antagonist in the Universal film serial The Green Hornet Strikes Again!. Watkin would attain more prominent roles in film serials, such as the role of Uncle Jim Fairfield in the 1947 Columbia serial Jack Armstrong. The following year, the studio cast him in the role of Perry White in their adaption of Superman. The serial was a success, leading to Watkin reprising his role in a follow-up, Atom Man vs. Superman, in 1950. Watkin also received prominent roles from low-budget poverty row studios, appearing in several Western films for Republic Pictures.

At the turn of the decade, Watkin began to segue into television as the medium began gaining popularity. Watkin appeared in several series, such as The Lone Ranger, Cheyenne, The Jack Benny Program, The Adventures of Rin Tin Tin, and The George Burns and Gracie Allen Show. He also made an appearance on I Love Lucy in 1954, portraying book editor Mr. Dorrance in the episode "Lucy Writes a Novel". Watkin appeared as several minor characters in different episodes of Adventures of Superman. When producers were looking to revive the series after its cancellation in 1958, Watkin was cast in the role of Perry White again, replacing the late John Hamilton. However, these plans never came to fruition after the death of series star George Reeves in June 1959.

Personal life 
Watkin first married Christie E. McLennan on August 21, 1909, in Ottawa, Kansas; the two had met while they were a part of a troupe together. They remained married until her death on April 4, 1930. Watkin remarried Mary Hart in Reading, Pennsylvania on September 25, 1932.

Watkin died on February 3, 1960, at age 72, at his home in Hollywood, California, from pneumonia and complications of diabetes. He was buried in Valhalla Memorial Park Cemetery, Burbank, California.

Filmography

References

External links

 
 

1887 births
1960 deaths
20th-century American male actors
American male film actors
American male stage actors
American male television actors
Vaudeville performers
Deaths from pneumonia in California
Actors from Sioux City, Iowa
Male actors from Kansas City, Missouri